Thomas Halsey may refer to:
Thomas Halsey (1655–1715), English MP for Hertfordshire 1685, 1695, 1698, 1701–05, 1708
Thomas Halsey (died 1788) (c.1731–1788), English MP for Hertfordshire 1768–84
Thomas Plumer Halsey (1815–1854), MP for Hertfordshire 1846–54
Frederick Halsey (Sir Thomas Frederick Halsey, 1839–1927), son of Thomas Plumer Halsey, MP for Hertfordshire 1874–85 and Watford 1885–1906
Thomas Jefferson Halsey (1863–1951), United States Representative from Missouri
Sir Thomas Halsey, 3rd Baronet (1898–1970), English cricketer and Royal Navy officer, grandson of Sir Thomas Frederick Halsey
Thomas Halsey (1591–1679) English immigrant to New York, co-founder of Southampton, New York